The 2016 Sait Nagjee Trophy was the 36th edition of the Sait Nagjee Football Tournament and the first edition of the tournament since 1995. This tournament was organized by the Kozhikode District Football Association (KDFA) under the patronage of Dr. Siddeek Ahmed, President KDFA, and was held in Kozhikode, Kerala, India, from 5 to 21 February 2016. Along with clubs from different parts of the world, the Argentina U-23 national team also took part in the tournament. Brazilian footballer Ronaldinho is the brand ambassador for the tournament.

FC Dnipro Reserves won the trophy beating Atlético Paranaense Reserves in the final.

Teams

Venue
EMS Corporation stadium, Kozhikode, Kerala.

Group stage

Group A

Group B

Knock-out phase

Bracket

Semi-finals

Final

References

External links
 
 Past Sait Nagjee Trophy Results 
 36th Sait Nagjee international club football 2016 Kozhikode

Sait Nagjee Trophy
2015–16 in Indian football
2016 in youth association football